1964 Emperor's Cup Final was the 44th final of the Emperor's Cup competition. The final was played at Kobe Oji Stadium in Hyōgo on January 17, 1965. Yawata Steel and Furukawa Electric won the championship.

Overview
Yawata Steel and Furukawa Electric won the championship. Yawata Steel was 1st title, Furukawa Electric was 3rd title.

Match details

See also
1964 Emperor's Cup

References

Emperor's Cup
Emperor's Cup Final
Emperor's Cup Final
JEF United Chiba matches